José Pereira may refer to:

 José Pereira (baseball) (1927–2001), Puerto Rican professional baseball player
 José Pereira (footballer) (born 1931), Portuguese goalkeeper
 José Pereira (pentathlete) (born 1918), Portuguese Olympic pentathlete
 José Pereira (scholar) (born 1931, died 2015), Sanskrit scholar, writer, and artist
 José Pereira (swimmer) (born 1955), Portuguese Olympic swimmer
 José Pereira (tennis) (born 1991), Brazilian tennis player
 José Maria Pereira (born 1932), Brazilian Olympic fencer
 José Pacheco Pereira (born 1949), Portuguese political analyst, historian and politician
 José Carlos Pereira, Brazilian Air Force officer
 José João Pereira (born 1981), Timorese footballer
 José Luiz Pereira (born 1943), Brazilian former footballer